Macrocheilus asteriscus is a species of ground beetle in the subfamily Anthiinae. It was described by White in 1844.

References

Anthiinae (beetle)
Beetles described in 1844